Andrew Woodruff (born May 7, 1985) is a Canadian football guard most recently for the Montreal Alouettes of the Canadian Football League. He was drafted by the Alouettes in the second of the 2008 CFL Draft. He played college football for the Boise State Broncos.

Professional career

Montreal Alouettes
Woodruff was drafted by the Montreal Alouettes in the second round of the 2008 CFL Draft. He held out for over a year until April 17, 2009.
Woodruff has won Grey Cups in 2009 and 2010 with the Montreal Alouettes.
Retirement announcement December 18, 2013.

References

External links
Just Sports Stats
Montreal Alouettes bio

1985 births
Living people
Sportspeople from Victoria, British Columbia
Players of Canadian football from British Columbia
Canadian football offensive linemen
Boise State Broncos football players
Montreal Alouettes players
Canadian players of American football